Wu Wei may refer to:

Wu wei, an important tenet of Taoism that involves knowing when to act and when not to act
Wu Wei (actress), Hong Kong actress
Wu Wei (footballer, born 1983), Chinese football player 
Wu Wei (footballer, born 1997), Chinese football player 
 (born 1970), Berlin-based Chinese musician and sheng virtuoso
Wu Wei (painter) (1459–1508), Chinese landscape painter during the Ming Dynasty
Maggie Wei Wu, Chinese business executive and CFO of Alibaba Group
Wei Wu Wei (1895–1986), British Taoist philosopher and writer
Ng Wei (born 1981), Chinese-Hong Kong badminton player
Wu Wei, 1993 album and recording by guitarist Pierre Bensusan

See also
Wuwei (disambiguation)